According to the beliefs of certain New Age movements, Arcturians are a very advanced extraterrestrial civilization from the solar system of Arcturus who wish to share their knowledge and wisdom with the citizens of Earth. They are described as other-dimensional, advanced star beings. Arcturians are said to be loving and peaceful beings who are willing to communicate and work with any soul that wishes to travel with them to a higher level of consciousness.

Currently, they would guard the Earth, help healing the planet and raise its vibrational energy. Emotional, mental, physical and spiritual transformation would be among their primary goals. Arcturians would regularly incarnate on Earth and would have been involved in Earth's evolution.

In addition to the Arcturian community, there are said to be similar communities on Sirius, Andromeda, Orion, Pleiades, Lyra and Antares.

Origin 
The ideas about Arcturians are based on the readings of Dolores Cannon, an American hypnotherapist, and Edgar Cayce, an American psychic. Cannon is a well-known figure in the American pseudoscience scene. Her work on starseeds, the idea that humans may be reincarnations of beings from other galaxies, goes back to Brad Steiger's ufology classic Gods of Aquarius.

Cayce called the Arcturians the most advanced community in the universe, the community most similar to the divine. The star Arcturus was mentioned by Cayce in more than 30 of his psychic readings, beginning in 1928. He saw Arcturus as a "gateway" to higher realms of consciousness that can have a profound effect on people's lives.

In the book The Keys of Enoch, Arcturus is described as an intermediate station used by the physical "brotherhoods of light" to oversee the many series of experiments with physical beings.

See also 
 Ancient astronauts
 Galactic Federation (ufology)
 Ground Crew Project
 Nordic aliens
 Otherkin

References 

Extraterrestrial life
New Age